Mattia Cherubini (born 4 March 1988) is a former Italian footballer.

References

External links
 

1988 births
Living people
Italian footballers
A.C. Giacomense players
Association football defenders